The Court of Judicature and Revision, also known as the Court of Judicial Review, was a central government agency in several imperial Chinese. From the Chinese, the system was also studied and implemented by  Vietnamese dynasties. It was generally in charge of reviewing judicial proceedings at all administrative levels and singling out the cases for a retrial by court officials or the emperor himself. In China, the office was created during the Northern Qi dynasty (550–577) and continued until the Qing dynasty (1636–1912). In Vietnam, it was adopted by Lê Thánh Tông in 1466, and continued until the Nguyễn dynasty.

It was one of the Nine Courts and worked closely with the Ministry of Justice and the Censorate. During the Qing dynasty it was the most prestigious of the Nine Courts.

References 

 

Nine Courts
Government of the Song dynasty
Government of the Tang dynasty
Government of the Yuan dynasty
Government of the Sui dynasty
Government of the Ming dynasty
Government of the Qing dynasty